Troy Cornelius (born 28 January 1983) is a Guyanese cricketer. He played in two first-class matches for Guyana in 2005.

See also
 List of Guyanese representative cricketers

References

External links
 

1983 births
Living people
Guyanese cricketers
Guyana cricketers